ZombsRoyale.io is a 2D battle royale video game developed by an American studio, End Game. It was released on 2018 for iOS, Android and on web browsers. Similar to other titles in the battle royale genre, players fight against other players on a large map from a top-down perspective, scavenging for supplies and weapons.

Gameplay 
The game is played in rounds that last for several minutes. Each round admits up to 100 players with the remainder filled by computer-controlled bots. Players are represented by circular figures on a 2D grid-like map, surrounded by a circular blue zone (called "the gas") that shrinks as the game advances, forcing players into a smaller and smaller area. Players take 2-10 damage to their health the longer they remain in the zone and can be eliminated if they stay in it. Players start the game with no weapons other than their fists or any melee skins. Weapons and healing items can be found across the map in loot containers, such as boxes, crates, and chests. Crates take on a different appearance on every location, but the ammo crate, golden crate and normal crate retains its appearance. Loot containers are located throughout the map inside and outside of buildings. Some healing items are bandages, med kits, Small Shield , Big Shield, Hybrid Potion and the healing gun. Weapons have power based on their rarity and are classified as common (grey), uncommon (green), rare (blue), epic (purple), legendary (gold), or mythic (red). Unique weapons can also be found across the map such as shurikens, flamethrowers, rubber guns and goo guns; they always come in legendary rarity. These are stored in a six-slot inventory (excluding the melee slot).

Modes and monetization 
There are multiple modes, the main ones being Solo, Duos, Squads, and LTMs (limited time modes). The active LTM change after a period of time; previous LTMs have included: Zombies, Protect the VIP, Weapons Race, Mystery Mode, 50v50, Superpower mode, and Crystal Clash. 

ZombsRoyale.io features different seasons; every season there are new locations, features, weapons and new modes. Each season also has its own battle pass, which the player levels up to earn rewards such as cosmetics and emotes, and more. There are two different currencies in the game, Gold and Gems. Gems can be used to upgrade the battle pass or purchase cosmetics in the Shop. Currently, the game is on Season 39, with a new season arriving every month or so.

Development 
ZombsRoyale.io is developed by End Game. The studio got its start building websites such as PokeVision, which helps users catch Pokémon in Pokémon Go. They then started making browser games after seeing the success of other games such as Slither.io. They first created Zombs.io, then Spinz.io and finally ZombsRoyale.io. The game was built in around 4 weeks, but after its successful launch, End Game spent the rest of 2018 supporting it.
In 2023, Zombs Royale Won the "EDP Memorial Award" From the BBC (Better Black Community) Foundation, for having the best game from the year 2022.

See also
 Surviv.io
 Fortnite
 PUBG: Battlegrounds

References

External links 

 
 Official wiki
Zombs Royale

2018 video games
Battle royale games
IOS games
Android (operating system) games
Browser games
Video games developed in the United States
.io video games